Luke William Peter Wells (born 29 December 1990) is an English cricketer who plays for Lancashire, having previously played for Sussex for 10 years. A left-handed top order batter and occasional right-arm legspin bowler, he made his debut at the end of the 2010 season.

He joined Lancashire in November 2020 having been released by Sussex.

Wells is the son of former England player Alan Wells, and the nephew of Colin Wells, both of whom also played for Sussex.

References

External links
 

Living people
1990 births
Sussex cricketers
Sportspeople from Eastbourne
English cricketers
Colombo Cricket Club cricketers
People educated at St Bede's School, Hailsham
Lancashire cricketers